LeClaire Historic District is a historic district located in Edwardsville, Illinois. The community was added to the National Register of Historic Places on August 8, 1979.

N. O. Nelson, the owner of the Nelson Manufacturing Company, established the town between 1890 and 1895 on donated land. Nelson planned the town to be an intentional community inspired by ideals such as Edward Bellamy's novel Looking Backward and the Ethical Culture movement. The community included an academy which offered free adult education and reading rooms, which was inspired by a self-culture hall in St. Louis.

Nelson also established a profit sharing system in the community. The system was derived from a concept used at the Maison LeClaire in Paris, from which the community took its name.

As LeClaire was an open community, its residents were not all company employees, nor were employees required to live in the community. However, the company provided utilities and public facilities to LeClaire residents. Journalist Nellie Bly compared the community favorably to Pullman in Chicago, and Ida Tarbell also wrote about the community.

References

Related reading

Company towns in Illinois
Edwardsville, Illinois
Historic districts on the National Register of Historic Places in Illinois
Houses in Madison County, Illinois
Houses on the National Register of Historic Places in Illinois
Intentional communities in the United States
National Register of Historic Places in Madison County, Illinois